Sidney Poitier was a Bahamian-American actor known for his appearances on the stage and screen. 

He became the first Black actor to win the Academy Award for Best Actor for Lilies of the Field (1963). He also received a Grammy Award, two Golden Globe Awards and a British Academy Film Award. Poitier received numerous honoraries during his lifetime including the Academy Honorary Award for his lifetime achievement in film in 2001. In 1992, he received the AFI Life Achievement Award. In 1994, he received a star on the Hollywood Walk of Fame. In 1981, he received the Golden Globe Cecil B. DeMille Award and in 2016 he received the BAFTA Fellowship.

In 1995, Poitier received the Kennedy Center Honor and in 2009, he was awarded the Presidential Medal of Freedom from Barack Obama. He was also awarded as Knight Commander of the Order of the British Empire by Queen Elizabeth II in 1974.

Awards

Academy Awards

British Academy Film Awards

Golden Globe Awards

Grammy Awards

Primetime Emmy Awards

Screen Actors Guild Awards

Tony Awards

Honorary Awards

AFI Life Achievement Award 
In 1992, Poitier received the AFI Life Achievement Award.

Kennedy Center Honors 
In 1995, Poitier received the Kennedy Center Honor

Presidential Medal of Freedom 
In 2009, Poitier was awarded the Presidential Medal of Freedom from Barack Obama.

Walk of Fame 
In 1994, Poitier received a star on the Hollywood Walk of Fame at 7065 Hollywood Blvd.

Honorary Knighthood 
 1974: Honorary Knight Commander of the Order of the British Empire (KBE)

Other tributes
 1958: Silver Bear for Best Actor (Berlin Film Festival) for The Defiant Ones
 1963: Silver Bear for Best Actor (Berlin Film Festival) for Lilies of the Field
 1997: Appointed non-resident Bahamian Ambassador to Japan
 2011: Film Society of Lincoln Center Gala Tribute honoring his life and careers
 2014: Golden Plate Award of the American Academy of Achievement, presented by Awards Council member Oprah Winfrey

References 

Poitier, Sidney